Killing in the Name is a 2010 documentary film on Islamist terrorism. It was nominated for the Academy Award for Best Documentary (Short Subject) at the 83rd Academy Awards on January 25, 2011 but lost to Strangers No More.

The film showed in Los Angeles DocuWeeks on July 30, 2010.

References

External links
 
 Killing in the Name at Moxie Firecracker Films

2010 films
American documentary films
Documentary films about jihadism
2010 documentary films
Works about Islamic terrorism
Films directed by Jed Rothstein
2010s English-language films
2010s American films